United States Senator Robert Byrd (November 20, 1917 – June 28, 2010) represented the U.S. state of West Virginia as a Democrat in the United States Senate. During his tenure as chairman of the United States Senate Committee on Appropriations, Byrd secured billions of dollars of Federal funds for projects throughout West Virginia, many of which bear his name. Byrd served four terms as Chairman of the Senate Appropriations Committee: January 3, 1989 through January 3, 1995; January 3, 2001 through January 20, 2001; June 6, 2001 through January 3, 2003; and January 3, 2007, through January 3, 2009. As a New Deal Democrat, Byrd used his position as chairman to battle persistent poverty in his home state of West Virginia, which he referred to as “one of the rock bottomest of states.” "I lost no opportunity to promote funding for programs and projects of benefit to the people back home," said Byrd.“ Within two years of his chairmanship, Byrd surpassed his announced five-year goal of making sure more than $1 billion in Federal funds was sent back to West Virginia. In referring to his economic contributions to West Virginia, Byrd said in 2000, "West Virginia has always had four friends: God Almighty, Sears Roebuck, Carter's Liver Pills and Robert C. Byrd."

Byrd's steering of billions of Federal dollars to West Virginia earned him the sobriquets "King of Pork" by the 501(c)(3) non-profit organization Citizens Against Government Waste and "Prince of Pork" from other taxpayer groups. According to Citizens Against Government Waste, Byrd was the first legislator to bring $1 billion of "pork" spending to his home state. The group named Byrd its initial "Porker of the Year" in 2002.

In addition to providing Federal funding to special projects, Byrd also ensured that many Federal complexes were built in West Virginia, including the Federal Bureau of Investigation's Criminal Justice Information Services Division complex in Clarksburg, the United States Coast Guard's National Maritime Center in Kearneysville, and a training center and firing range  for U.S. Customs and Border Protection officers near Harpers Ferry. Clarksburg's FBI facility was the first of the major Federal complexes to be built under Byrd's leadership as chairman of the appropriations committee. In West Virginia's Eastern Panhandle, Byrd helped bring ten federal facilities that employed more than 3,200 people. None of these facilities are named for him, however. 

More than 50 buildings built with funds from US taxpayers directed to West Virginia are named for either Byrd or his wife, Erma Ora Byrd (née James). Several transportation projects named for Byrd have gained national notoriety, including the Robert C. Byrd Highway. Also known as "Corridor H" of the Appalachian Development Highway System, the highway was dubbed "West Virginia's road to nowhere" in 2009 after it received a $9.5 million earmark in the $410 billion Omnibus Appropriations Act. The highway received another $21 million from the American Recovery and Reinvestment Act of 2009. Critics argued the traffic on the highway was too light and the cost too high for the project to continue construction until its proposed completion in 2035. The State of West Virginia argued the highway was necessary as "an ideal evacuation route for Washington, about 100 miles away, in case of an emergency."

Academia, science, and technology

Robert C. Byrd Academic and Technology Center, Marshall University in Huntington, West Virginia
Robert C. Byrd Academic and Technology Center, Marshall University Graduate College in South Charleston, West Virginia
Robert C. Byrd Auditorium, National Conservation Training Center in Shepherdstown, West Virginia
Robert C. Byrd Biotechnology Science Center, Marshall University in Huntington, West Virginia
Robert C. Byrd Cancer Research Laboratory, West Virginia University in Morgantown, West Virginia
Robert C. Byrd Center for Legislative Studies, Shepherd University in Shepherdstown, West Virginia
Robert C. Byrd Center for Pharmacy Education, University of Charleston in Charleston, West Virginia
Robert C. Byrd Center for Rural Health, Marshall University in Huntington, West Virginia
Robert C. Byrd Clinical Teaching Center, Charleston Area Medical Center Memorial Hospital in Charleston, West Virginia
Robert C. Byrd Green Bank Telescope, Green Bank, West Virginia
Robert C. Byrd Hardwood Technologies Center, Princeton, West Virginia
Robert C. Byrd Health Sciences Center, West Virginia University in Morgantown, West Virginia
Robert C. Byrd Health Sciences Center Charleston Division, Charleston, West Virginia
Robert C. Byrd High School, Clarksburg, West Virginia
Robert C. Byrd Institute for Advanced Flexible Manufacturing (RCBI) Bridgeport Manufacturing Technology Center, Bridgeport, West Virginia
RCBI Charleston Manufacturing Technology Center, South Charleston, West Virginia
RCBI Huntington Manufacturing Technology Center, Huntington, West Virginia
RCBI Rocket Center Manufacturing Technology Center, Rocket Center, West Virginia
Robert C. Byrd Institute for Composites Technology and Training Center, Bridgeport, West Virginia
Robert C. Byrd Library, Wheeling, West Virginia
Robert C. Byrd Library and Robert C. Byrd Learning Resource Center, University of Charleston in Beckley
Robert C. Byrd Life Long Learning Center, Eastern West Virginia Community and Technical College in Moorefield, West Virginia
Robert C. Byrd Life Long Learning Center, West Virginia University in Morgantown, West Virginia
Robert C. Byrd Metals Fabrication Center, Rocket Center, West Virginia
Robert C. Byrd National Aerospace Education Center, Bridgeport, West Virginia (affiliated with Fairmont State University)
Robert C. Byrd National Technology Transfer Center, Wheeling Jesuit University in Wheeling, West Virginia
Robert C. Byrd Regional Training Institute, Camp Dawson near Kingwood, West Virginia
Robert C. Byrd Science and Technology Center, Shepherd University in Shepherdstown, West Virginia
Robert C. Byrd Technology Center, Alderson–Broaddus College in Philippi, West Virginia
Robert C. Byrd United Technical Center

Commerce
Robert C. Byrd Hilltop Office Complex, Rocket Center, West Virginia
Robert C. Byrd Industrial Park, Moorefield, West Virginia

Community
Robert C. Byrd Community Center, Pine Grove, West Virginia
Robert C. Byrd Community Center, Sugar Grove, West Virginia

Government
Robert C. Byrd Rooms, Office of the West Virginia Senate Minority Leader, West Virginia State Capitol in Charleston, West Virginia
Robert C. Byrd United States Courthouse and Federal Building, Beckley, West Virginia
Robert C. Byrd United States Courthouse and Federal Building, Charleston, West Virginia
Robert C. Byrd Federal Correctional Institution, Hazelton, West Virginia

Healthcare
Robert C. Byrd Clinic, West Virginia School of Osteopathic Medicine in Lewisburg, West Virginia
Robert C. Byrd Clinical Addition to Veteran's Hospital, Huntington, West Virginia

Recreation and tourism
Robert C. Byrd Addition to the Lodge at Oglebay Park, Wheeling, West Virginia
Robert C. Byrd Conference Center (also known as the Robert C. Byrd Center for Hospitality and Tourism), Davis & Elkins College in Elkins, West Virginia
Robert C. Byrd Visitor Center, Harpers Ferry National Historical Park in Harpers Ferry, West Virginia

Transportation

Robert C. Byrd Appalachian Highway System, Appalachian Development Highway System in West Virginia
Robert C. Byrd Bridge, crosses the Ohio River between Huntington, West Virginia and Chesapeake, Ohio
Robert C. Byrd Bridge, Ohio County, West Virginia
Robert C. Byrd Drive, West Virginia Routes 16 and 97 between Beckley and Sophia, West Virginia
Robert C. Byrd Expressway, United States Route 22 near Weirton, West Virginia
Robert C. Byrd Freeway, United States Route 119 between Williamson and Charleston, West Virginia (also known as Corridor G)
Robert C. Byrd Highway, United States Route 48 between Weston, West Virginia and the Virginia state line near Wardensville, West Virginia (also known as Corridor H)
Robert C. Byrd Interchange on Interstate 77
Robert C. Byrd Interchange on United States Route 19, Birch River, West Virginia
Robert C. Byrd Intermodal Transportation Center, Wheeling, West Virginia
Robert C. Byrd Locks and Dam, Ohio River in Gallipolis Ferry, West Virginia

Erma Ora Byrd

The following places are named after Robert Byrd's wife, Erma Ora Byrd:

Erma Byrd Biomedical Research Center, West Virginia University in Morgantown, West Virginia
Erma Ora Byrd Center for Educational Technologies, Wheeling Jesuit University in Wheeling, West Virginia
Erma Ora Byrd Clinical Center, Marshall University School of Medicine in Huntington, West Virginia
Erma Ora Byrd Conference and Learning Center, Rocket Center, West Virginia
Erma Byrd Eastern Panhandle Health Professions Center, Martinsburg, West Virginia
Erma Byrd Gallery, University of Charleston in Charleston, West Virginia
Erma Byrd Garden, Graceland Mansion in Elkins, West Virginia
Erma Ora Byrd Hall, Department of Nursing Education, Shepherd University in Shepherdstown, West Virginia
Erma Byrd Higher Education Center, Concord University Beckley Campus in Beaver, West Virginia

References

Lists of places named after people
Lists of places in the United States
Lists of places in West Virginia
Byrd, Robert